The following is a list of Malayalam films released in the year 1971.

Dubbed Films

References

 1971
1971
Lists of 1971 films by country or language
Mal